And Life, and Tears, and Love is a 1983 Soviet drama film directed by Nikolay Gubenko.

Plot 
The film takes place in the house of veterans, in which people are very bored living. Suddenly, a new head doctor comes into the house and tries not only to treat the elderly, but also to restore their love of life and other people.

Cast 
 Zhanna Bolotova as Varvara
 Yelena Fadeyeva as Serbina
 Fyodor Nikitin as Pavel Andreyevich
 Pyotr Shcherbakov as Fedot Fedotovich
 Sergey Martinson as Yegoshkin (as Sergei Martinson)
 Yevgeny Yevstigneyev as Stepanych
 Ivan Kozlovsky as cameo
 Mikhail Brylkin as Chistov
 Kapitolina Ilyenko as Ptitsyna
 Aleksei Drozdov as Berdyayev
 Natalya Gundareva as  Antonina Efimovna, cook
 Lyubov Sokolova as  Polina Ivanovna
 Natalya Krachkovskaya as  Masha

References

External links 
 

1983 films
1980s Russian-language films
Soviet drama films
1983 drama films
Mosfilm films
Films about old age